The Athenaeum in Princess Street Manchester, England, now part of Manchester Art Gallery, was originally a club built for the Manchester Athenaeum, a society for the "advancement and diffusion of knowledge", in 1837. The society, founded in 1835, met in the adjacent Royal Manchester Institution until funds had been raised for the building. The society survived financial difficulties to become the centre for Manchester's literary life. It ceased operations in 1938.

Sir Charles Barry designed the Athenaeum building in the Italian palazzo style, the first such building in the city. Manchester Corporation acquired the building in 1938.

In 2002, Manchester Art Gallery was extended by Hopkins Architects following an architectural design competition managed by RIBA Competitions to take in the Athenaeum. It is linked to the art gallery by a glass atrium. The Athenaeum is a grade II* listed building.

Society
The Manchester Athenaeum for the Advancement and Diffusion of Knowledge was founded in 1835, with James Heywood as its first president. It met initially at the Royal Manchester Institution until funds had been raised for its own building, which was completed in 1837. Their new premises had a newsroom on the ground floor, and a library, lecture hall and coffee room. A billiards room and gymnasium were added later.

Richard Cobden was instrumental in promoting education in the city and spoke at the opening. He, along with a significant number of other members of the Anti-Corn Law League's Council, was an important figure in both instigating and developing the society during its early years. He described it as a "manufactory for working up the raw intelligence of the town".

By 1838, there were over 1,000 members, each paying an annual subscription of 30 shillings. The club then hit upon and survived financial difficulties to become the centre for Manchester's literary life. A report about the society in the Sheffield Times in 1847 noted that it catered for the "mental and moral improvement" of the intelligent among the middle-classes and that the shared pursuit of "rational amusement" was an aid to bridging the social gap between masters and men. That report, and thus the society, directly inspired two societies with similar goals in Sheffield, confusingly both calling themselves the Sheffield Athenaeum.

The society was promoted as "an institution for the benefit of the tradesmen, commercial assistants and apprentices, professional students, clerks, of this very populous and flourishing town". It also emphasised its admission of women, although in practice until 1844 they had limited membership rights, being barred from full engagement in its activities and from its management. Charles Dickens and Benjamin Disraeli addressed its membership in the 1840s.

Manchester Corporation acquired the building in 1938, when the society ceased operations.

Architecture
Sir Charles Barry, who designed the Royal Manchester Institution in the Greek Revival style, designed the Athenaeum in the Italian palazzo style, the first such building in the city.

The building is constructed of sandstone ashlar under a slate roof on a rectangular plan and originally had two storeys and a basement. It has a symmetrical nine-window facade with raised rusticated quoins at the corners and an inscribed frieze under a prominent mutuled cornice. The inscriptions on the frieze are, "INSTUTVTED MDCCCXXXV ATHENAEUM ERECTED MDCCCXXXVIII" and "FOR THE ADVANCEMENT AND DIFFVSION OF KNOWLEDGE".

A central entrance porch with a coffered barrel-vaulted ceiling is accessed by a flight of stone steps and has Doric columns supporting a frieze, moulded cornice and balustraded parapet. The first and second floors have tall two-light casement windows with architraves, balustrades and pediments to the second floor.

See also

Grade II* listed buildings in Greater Manchester
Listed buildings in Manchester-M1
List of societies for education in Manchester

References
Notes

Bibliography

Art museums and galleries in Manchester
Grade II* listed buildings in Manchester
Charles Barry buildings
Manchester Art Gallery